Gabriel Cordeiro Pirani  (born 12 April 2002) is a Brazilian footballer who plays as an attacking midfielder for Fluminense, on loan from Santos.

Club career

Santos
Born in Penápolis, São Paulo, Pirani joined Santos' youth setup at the age of ten. On 27 July 2018, he signed his first professional contract with the club, agreeing to a deal until June 2021.

On 3 February 2020, Pirani further extended his contract, until December 2022. The following 25 February, he made his first team – and Série A – debut, coming on as a half-time substitute for Fernando Pileggi in a 0–2 away loss against Bahia.

Pirani scored his first professional goal on 28 February 2021, netting his team's second in a 2–2 Campeonato Paulista away draw against Santo André. He made his Copa Libertadores debut on 9 March, replacing Sandry in a 2–1 home success over Deportivo Lara.

On 21 May 2021, after establishing himself as a regular in the main squad, Pirani renewed his contract until December 2025. In the 2022 season, however, he lost his starting spot under manager Fabián Bustos.

Loan to Cuiabá
On 13 June 2022, Santos agreed to loan Pirani to fellow top tier side Cuiabá until the end of the season, with the move being effective on 18 July. He scored on his club debut, netting a last-minute equalizer in a 1–1 home draw against Atlético Mineiro three days later, but only featured in nine more matches during the competition, as Dourado narrowly avoided relegation.

Loan to Fluminense
After being requested to return to Santos' first team squad by head coach Odair Hellmann in December 2022, Pirani featured rarely, and moved to Fluminense also in the first division on 23 February 2023, on loan until the end of the year. In his second game, he scored the winning goal in a 2–1 win over Flamengo, which led his side to the Taça Guanabara title.

Career statistics

References

External links
Santos FC profile 

2002 births
Living people
Footballers from São Paulo (state)
Brazilian footballers
Association football midfielders
Campeonato Brasileiro Série A players
Santos FC players
Cuiabá Esporte Clube players
Fluminense FC players
People from Penápolis